Chester Township is one of nine townships in Wells County, Indiana, United States. As of the 2010 census, its population was 936 and it contained 394 housing units.

Geography

Cities, towns, villages
 Poneto

Unincorporated towns
 Five Points at 
 Greenville at 
 Keystone at 
(This list is based on USGS data and may include former settlements.)

Adjacent townships
 Liberty Township (north)
 Harrison Township (northeast)
 Nottingham Township (east)
 Harrison Township, Blackford County (south)
 Washington Township, Blackford County (southwest)
 Jackson Township (west)
 Salamonie Township, Huntington County (northwest)

Cemeteries
The township contains these two cemeteries: Miller and Snow.

Airports and landing strips
 Brinnemans Headacres Airport

School districts
 Southern Wells Community Schools

Political districts
 Indiana's 3rd congressional district
 State House District 82
 State Senate District 19

History
Chester Township is home to the 5 Points School. It was built in 1876 and served as a school periodically through the late 1930s. It also served as a Grange Hall and many other community meetings were held here. While the 5 Points School stands to this day, its successor the Chester Center School, which was built in 1923, was demolished 43 years later in 1966 after the districts in southern Wells County were consolidated.

References
 United States Census Bureau 2007 TIGER/Line Shapefiles
 United States Board on Geographic Names (GNIS)
 IndianaMap

External links
 Indiana Township Association
 United Township Association of Indiana

Townships in Wells County, Indiana
Fort Wayne, IN Metropolitan Statistical Area
Townships in Indiana